Tom Bokenham Reddick (17 February 1912 – 1 June 1982) was an English cricketer who played for Middlesex, Nottinghamshire and Western Province. He was born in Shanghai and died in Cape Town. 

Reddick appeared in 62 first-class matches between 1931 and 1950 as a right-handed batsman who bowled occasional leg breaks. Most of his cricket in the 1930s was for Sir Julien Cahn's XI. His only full seasons of county cricket were for Nottinghamshire in 1946 and 1947. After his playing career finished he settled in South Africa, where he became a prominent coach. Basil D'Oliveira was one of the young players he coached.

References

External links

1912 births
1982 deaths
Sportspeople from Shanghai
English cricketers
Middlesex cricketers
Nottinghamshire cricketers
Western Province cricketers
English cricket coaches